Millbank is a small Canadian rural community located in the northeastern part of Northumberland County, New Brunswick.

It is located on the boundary of the city of Miramichi.

History

Notable people

See also
List of communities in New Brunswick

References

External links
 Geographical Names of Canada - Millbank

Communities in Northumberland County, New Brunswick